Safaa Rashid Mahmood Al-Jumaili (born 1 January 1990, Diyala) is an Iraqi weightlifter competing in the 85 kg category. He competed at the 2012 Summer Olympics.

Major results

References 

1990 births
Living people
Iraqi male weightlifters
Weightlifters at the 2012 Summer Olympics
Olympic weightlifters of Iraq
Asian Games gold medalists for Iraq
Weightlifters at the 2018 Asian Games
Medalists at the 2018 Asian Games
Asian Games medalists in weightlifting

People from Diyala Province
Islamic Solidarity Games medalists in weightlifting
20th-century Iraqi people
21st-century Iraqi people